Alfred Hector Roland (1797 — 13 March 1874) was a French composer, poet and founder of the Conservatory of Music of Bagnères-de-Bigorre in South Western France.

References 

French musicians
1797 births
1874 deaths